Artem (Artyom) Ivanovich Mikoyan (– 9 December 1970) was a Soviet Armenian aircraft designer, who cofounded the Mikoyan-Gurevich design bureau along with Mikhail Gurevich.

Early life and career
Mikoyan was born in Sanahin, Armenia, on 5 August 1905. His older brother, Anastas Mikoyan, would become official head of state of the Soviet Union. He completed his basic education and took a job as a machine-tool operator in Rostov, then worked in the "Dynamo" factory in Moscow before being conscripted into the military. After military service he joined the Zhukovsky Air Force Academy, where he created his first plane, graduating in 1936. He worked with Polikarpov before being named head of a new aircraft design bureau in Moscow in December 1939. Together with Mikhail Gurevich, Mikoyan formed the Mikoyan-Gurevich design bureau, producing a series of fighter aircraft. In March 1942, the bureau was renamed OKB MiG (Osoboye Konstruktorskoye Byuro), ANPK MiG (Aviatsionnyy nauchno-proizvodstvennyy kompleks) and OKO MiG. The MiG-1 proved to be a poor start, the MiG-3 went into production but only occasionally could it fight in its intended high-level interceptor role. Further MiG-5, MiG-7 and MiG-8 Utka did not progress beyond research prototypes.

Jet aircraft designs

Early post-war designs were based on domestic works as well as captured German jet fighters and information provided by Britain or the US. By 1946, Soviet designers were still having trouble in perfecting the German-designed, axial-flow BMW 109-003 jet engine — blueprints for the 109-003 turbojet had been seized by Soviet forces from the Basdorf-Zühlsdorf plant near Berlin and from the Central Works near Nordhausen. Production of the 003 was set up at the "Red October" GAZ 466 (Gorkovsky Avtomobilny Zavod, or Gorky Automobile Plant) in Leningrad, where the 003 jet engine was mass-produced from 1947 under the designation RD-20 (reaktivnyy dvigatel, or "jet engine"). New Soviet airframe designs from their design bureaus, and near-sonic wing designs were threatening to outstrip development of the jet engines needed to power them. Soviet aviation minister Mikhail Khrunichev and aircraft designer Alexander Sergeyevich Yakovlev suggested to Joseph Stalin that the USSR buy advanced jet engines from the British. Stalin is said to have replied: "What fool will sell us his secrets?" However, he gave his assent to the proposal, and Artem Mikoyan, engine designer Klimov, and other officials traveled to the United Kingdom to request the engines. To Stalin's amazement, the British Labour government and its pro-Soviet minister of trade, Sir Stafford Cripps were willing to provide technical information and a licence to manufacture the Rolls-Royce Nene centrifugal-flow jet engine. This engine was reverse-engineered and produced in modified form as the Soviet Klimov VK-1 jet engine, later incorporated into the MiG-15 (Rolls-Royce later attempted to claim £207 millions in licence fees, without success).

In the interim, on 15 April 1947, the Council of Ministers issued a decree #493-192, ordering the Mikoyan OKB to build two prototypes for a new jet fighter. As the decree called for first flights as soon as December of that same year, the designers at OKB-155 fell back on an earlier troublesome design, the MiG-9 of 1946. The MiG-9 used a pair of the RD-20 Soviet copies of the BMW 003 for its power, which proved to be unreliable, with the airframe's straight-winged design suffering from control problems.

The prototype-only Mikoyan-Gurevich I-270 of the immediate post-war era was a rocket-powered, "straight-winged" point-defense fighter design based on captured examples of, and documentation for the never-produced German Messerschmitt Me 263, which had some influence on future MiG jet fighter designs.  Thanks to the MiG OKB designing the very first airworthy swept-wing Soviet aircraft design of any type in 1945, the strictly experimental Mikoyan-Gurevich MiG-8 Utka canard pusher monoplane, the swept-wing research from it and captured German research documents allowed the Soviets to eventually develop the prototype design for the single-jet MiG-15 fighter, the I-310. With the Klimov VK-1 version of the British Nene jet engine, this design became the mass-produced MiG-15, which first flew on 31 December 1948, some fifteen months after the first prototype of its American swept-winged counterpart, the XP-86 Sabre first flew. Despite its mixed origins, this aircraft had excellent performance and formed the basis for a number of future fighters. The MiG-15 was originally intended to intercept American bombers such as the B-29 Superfortress, and was even evaluated in mock air-to-air combat trials with interned ex-U.S. B-29 bombers as well as the later Soviet B-29 copy, the Tupolev Tu-4. A variety of MiG-15 variants were built, but the most common was the MiG-15UTI (NATO 'Midget') two-seat trainer. Over 18,000 MiG-15s were eventually manufactured, then came the MiG-17, and MiG-19.

The MiG-15s were the jets used during the Korean War by Communist forces, and "MiG Alley" was the name given by U.S. Air Force pilots to the northwestern portion of North Korea, where the Yalu River empties into the Yellow Sea. During the Korean War, it was the site of numerous dogfights between U.S. fighter jets and those of the Communist forces, particularly the Soviet Union. The F-86 Sabre and the Soviet-built Mikoyan-Gurevich MiG-15 fighters were the aircraft used throughout most of the conflict, with the area's nickname derived from the latter. Because it was the site of the first large-scale jet-vs-jet air battles, MiG Alley is considered the birthplace of jet fighter combat.

Later work

From 1952 Mikoyan also designed missile systems to particularly suit his aircraft, such as the famous MiG-21. He continued to produce high performance fighters through the 1950s and 1960s.

He was twice awarded the highest civilian honour, the Hero of Socialist Labor and was a deputy in six Supreme Soviets.

After Gurevich's death, the name of the design bureau was changed from Mikoyan-Gurevich to simply Mikoyan. However, the designator remained MiG. Many more designs came from the design bureau such as the MiG-23, MiG-29 and MiG-35 and variations.

After suffering from a stroke that occurred in 1969, Mikoyan died the following year and was buried in the Novodevichy Cemetery in Moscow.

Honours and awards
Some of his awards and honours include:
Twice Hero of Socialist Labour
Six Orders of Lenin
Order of the Red Banner
Order of the Patriotic War 1st class
Two Orders of the Red Star
Lenin Prize (1962)
USSR State Prize (1941, 1947, 1948, 1949, 1952, 1953)

In 1996, Mikoyan was inducted into the International Air & Space Hall of Fame at the San Diego Air & Space Museum.

References

External links
 Mikoyan Brothers Museum, Sanahin, Alaverdi, Armenia

1905 births
1970 deaths
Armenian engineers
Armenian inventors
Armenian scientists
Burials at Novodevichy Cemetery
People from Lori Province
Heroes of Socialist Labour
Stalin Prize winners
Soviet aerospace engineers
Soviet politicians
Communist Party of the Soviet Union members
Soviet military personnel
Soviet inventors
Full Members of the USSR Academy of Sciences
Russian Aircraft Corporation MiG
Recipients of the Order of Lenin
Lenin Prize winners
Members of the Supreme Soviet of the Soviet Union
Soviet Armenians
Mikoyan family